Pascal Jolyot (born 26 July 1958) is a French fencer. He won a gold medal in the team foil and a silver in the individual foil events at the 1980 Summer Olympics. He won a bronze medal in the team foil event at the 1984 Summer Olympics.

References

External links
 

1958 births
Living people
French male foil fencers
Olympic fencers of France
Fencers at the 1980 Summer Olympics
Fencers at the 1984 Summer Olympics
Olympic gold medalists for France
Olympic silver medalists for France
Olympic bronze medalists for France
Sportspeople from Fontainebleau
Olympic medalists in fencing
Medalists at the 1980 Summer Olympics
Medalists at the 1984 Summer Olympics